Mark Daniel Bernhardt (born June 11, 1958) is an American-Canadian economist, focusing in industrial organization, finance and political economy, currently the IBE Distinguished Professor of Economics at University of Illinois. Bernhardt is also a professor at the University of Warwick. 

Bernhardt was born in Berkeley, California. At the time, his father was an economics professor at the University of California-Berkeley. Bernhardt graduated from Bluevale Collegiate Institute in 1976, while his father, Irwin Bernhardt, was a professor at the University of Waterloo. Bernhardt was captain of both the wrestling and math teams in high school.

Bernhardt attended Oberlin College, where he was roommates with future Grammy Award winner, Marc Cohn. He graduated in 1981 with a degree in economics and mathematics, was elected to Phi Beta Kappa. He received his Ph. D. in economics from the Graduate School of Industrial Administration (now the Tepper School of Business) in 1986 and was awarded the Alexander Henderson Award for an outstanding thesis in economic theory. During this time, Bernhardt was classmates with current President of the Federal Reserve Bank of Chicago, Charles Evans, as well as current Carolina Panthers owner, David Tepper. 

Prior to being a professor at the University of Illinois, Bernhardt was a professor at Queen's University at Kingston in Kingston, Ontario. He has also worked at the University of Rochester and the Federal Reserve Bank of Cleveland. 

Bernhardt was a collegiate wrestler at Oberlin College. He later coached the wrestling program at Queen's University, where he trained Olympian, Paul Ragusa.

Bernhardt endorsed Hillary Clinton in the 2016 US Presidential Election, and later endorsed Joe Biden in the 2020 US Presidential Election.

Bernhardt is Jewish.

References

Living people
University of Illinois faculty
American economists
Carnegie Mellon University alumni
1958 births